Bagda is a village near Bhadresar in Kutch district, Gujarat, India.

Places of interest
There are some memorial stones, Paliyas, the earliest dated 1648 (Samvat 1705) dedicated to one Khatri Parmanand. Halfway between Bagda and nearby village Vaghura is a small temple of Phuleshvar Mahadev, eleven feet by twelve, with writing which seems to show that it was rebuilt in 1837 (Samvat 1894) by Swami Surajgar. Weather-worn images of Parvati, Hanuman, and the Nandi lie about, and there is a ruined sati memorial stone dated 1630 (Samvat 1687). The stepwell between Bagda and Vaghura was, in 1853 (Samvat 1910), rebuilt by Gosai Hiragar Jivangar.

References

Villages in Kutch district